The Rukatunturi ski jumping hill, located in Kuusamo, is the largest ski jumping hill in Finland. It regularly hosts the opening event of the ski jumping World Cup.

The large hill and two smaller hills have a plastic matting. The official record is 150.5 metres, jumped by Halvor Egner Granerud, in the Ski Jumping  competition in 2022.

References

External links 
 

Kuusamo
Ski jumping venues in Finland